Končanica is a town and a municipality in Slavonia, in the Bjelovar-Bilogora County of Croatia. The population is 2,360 with 47.0% Czechs and 41.7% Croats (2011 census). As such, it is one of a small number of counties where ethnic Croats do not form a majority or plurality.

History
In the late 19th and early 20th century, Končanica was part of the Požega County of the Kingdom of Croatia-Slavonia.

See also
List of Croatian municipalities with minority languages in official use

References

Municipalities of Croatia
Populated places in Bjelovar-Bilogora County
Slavonia
Czech communities